Crassocephalum vitellinum is a flowering herb from Africa.

Distribution
Bioko, Burundi, Cameroon, Kenya, Rwanda, Uganda, Tanzania, Zambia, Zaire.

References

External links
 

vitellinum
Flora of Africa